Eumenes mediterraneus is a species of potter wasp in the subfamily Eumeninae of the family Vespidae.

Subspecies
 Eumenes mediterraneus cypricus Bluethgen, 1938
 Eumenes mediterraneus mediterraneus Kriechbaumer, 1879

Distribution
This species can be found in most European countries, in the Near East and in North Africa.

Description
Eumenes mediterraneus can reach a length of about 15 millimetres. Body is black with yellow markings. Clypeus is mainly yellow and scutellum has two large spots. Tergite I has a broad apical yellow band. Tergite II has two large yellow bands laterally and a pale and translucent apical lamella. Tergites V and VI have a yellow apical band.

In males antennae are curled at tip. In females the segment between the compound eyes is yellow with black spots in inferior part.

References

Potter wasps
Hymenoptera of Europe
Insects described in 1879
Taxa named by Joseph Kriechbaumer